German submarine U-189 was a Type IXC/40 U-boat of Nazi Germany's Kriegsmarine built for service during World War II.
Her keel was laid down on 12 September 1941 by DeSchiMAG AG Weser in Bremen as yard number 1035. She was launched on 1 May 1942 and commissioned on 15 August with Korvettenkapitän Hellmut Kurrer in command.

The U-boat's service began with training as part of the 4th U-boat Flotilla. She then moved to the 2nd flotilla on 1 April 1943 for operations.

She was sunk by a British aircraft on 23 April 1943.

Design
German Type IXC/40 submarines were slightly larger than the original Type IXCs. U-189 had a displacement of  when at the surface and  while submerged. She had two shafts and two  propellers.

U-189 was fitted with six  torpedo tubes (four fitted at the bow and two at the stern), 22 torpedoes, one  SK C/32 naval gun, 180 rounds, and a  SK C/30 as well as a  C/30 anti-aircraft gun. The boat had a complement of forty-eight.

Service history

Patrol and loss
U-189s patrol took her from Kiel on 3 April 1943, across the North Sea and into the Atlantic Ocean through the 'gap' between Greenland and Iceland.

She was sunk east of Cape Farewell (Greenland) by depth charges dropped by a British Liberator on 23 April 1943. Fifty-four men were killed; leaving no survivors.

The pilot of the Liberator reported the sinking and about 50 men in the water, but received the answer that no ships would be made available for rescue. All were left to perish in the ice cold sea and 54 in total died.

Wolfpacks
U-189 took part in one wolfpack, namely:
 Meise (21 – 23 April 1943)

References

Bibliography

External links

World War II submarines of Germany
German Type IX submarines
1942 ships
U-boats commissioned in 1942
U-boats sunk in 1943
Ships lost with all hands
World War II shipwrecks in the Atlantic Ocean
Ships built in Bremen (state)
U-boats sunk by depth charges
U-boats sunk by British aircraft
Maritime incidents in April 1943